Airdale Sportplane and Supply (also called the Airdale Flyer Company) was an American aircraft manufacturer, founded by Brett McKinney and based in Rhinelander, Wisconsin. The company specialized in the design and manufacture of light aircraft in the form of kits for amateur construction, as well as replacement aircraft parts.

The company was formed in 1999 after Avid Aircraft initially went out of business in 1998. Avid was restarted, but went out of business for the final time in November 2003. Airdale initially started making parts for Avid designs and later put the two-seat Avid Mk IV back into production. The Mk IV was further developed into the Airdale Backcountry by John Larsen, an aircraft initially called the Airdale Airdale. A conversion kit to modify Mk IVs to Backcountry standard is available. The company also produces an improved landing gear set for the Avid Mk IV design, called Bushgear.

At one time the company also produced the Avid Magnum as a kit aircraft.

As of mid 2017 the company was no longer trading.

Aircraft

References

External links

Defunct aircraft manufacturers of the United States
Companies based in Wisconsin
Oneida County, Wisconsin
Homebuilt aircraft